Ward MacLaurin Cornell (4 May 1924 – 5 February 2000) was a Canadian broadcaster noted for hosting Hockey Night in Canada between 1959 and 1972.

Biography
He was born in London, Ontario where he studied at the University of Western Ontario. There, he became a CFPL (AM) radio announcer of campus sports games. Following graduation in 1949, he presented sports news in the early years of CFPL-TV. During the next five years, he held a tutorial position, teaching English Literature, History and Geography, at Pickering College in Newmarket, Ontario while still finding the time to perform announcing duties for sports events on radio and play roles in drama performances on the CBC Radio network. Then in 1954 he became general manager at CFPL radio, holding that post for 13 years.

Following his 1972 departure from Hockey Night in Canada, Cornell became Ontario's Agent-General in London, UK. He then received deputy minister appointments in various provincial ministries.

Cornell died aged 75 at Uxbridge, Ontario due to emphysema.  He left his wife Georgina Saxon (m. 1969) and five children. He is buried in Uxbridge Cemetery.

References
 

1924 births
2000 deaths
Canadian sports announcers
Cornell family
People from London, Ontario
University of Western Ontario alumni
Deaths from emphysema
Canadian Football League announcers
National Hockey League broadcasters
People from Uxbridge, Ontario